Uri is a rural locality (a selo) in Urinsky Selsoviet, Laksky District, Republic of Dagestan, Russia. The population was 153 as of 2010.

Geography 
Uri is located 16 km northwest of Kumukh (the district's administrative centre) by road, on the left bank of the Kunikh River. Mukar and Kurkhi are the nearest rural localities.

Nationalities 
Laks live there.

Famous residents 
Omar Azizov (senior militia lieutenant, awarded the Order of Courage)

References 

Rural localities in Laksky District